The 1988 Mississippi State Bulldogs football team represented Mississippi State University during the 1988 NCAA Division I-A football season. After winning the opener against Louisiana Tech, the Bulldogs lost all 10 remaining games. The season is now commonly referred to as "Tech and Ten" by Bulldog fans.

Schedule

References

Mississippi State
Mississippi State Bulldogs football seasons
Mississippi State Bulldogs football